The 201st New York State Legislature, consisting of the New York State Senate and the New York State Assembly, met from January 7, 2015, to December 31, 2016, during the fifth and sixth years of Andrew Cuomo's governorship, in Albany.

State Senate

Senators
The asterisk (*) denotes members of the previous Legislature who continued in office as members of this Legislature. Assembly members Roxanne Persaud and Todd Kaminsky were elected to fill vacancies in the Senate.

Note: For brevity, the chairmanships omit the words "...the Committee on (the)..."

Employees
 Secretary: ?

State Assembly

Assembly members
The asterisk (*) denotes members of the previous Legislature who continued in office as members of this Legislature.

Note: For brevity, the chairmanships omit the words "...the Committee on (the)..."

Employees
 Secretary: ?

References

Sources
 Senate election results at NYS Board of Elections
 Assembly election results at NYS Board of Elections
 19th and 52nd Senate D. special election results at NYS Board of Elections
 29th, 46th and 128th Assembly D. special election results at NYS Board of Elections

201
2015 politics in New York (state)
2016 politics in New York (state)
Independent Democratic Conference
2015 in New York (state)
2016 in New York (state)
2015 U.S. legislative sessions
2016 U.S. legislative sessions